The eighth series of The Great British Sewing Bee began on 27 April 2022. Sara Pascoe replaced Joe Lycett as the presenter of the show, with both Esme Young and Patrick Grant returning as judges. This series saw the programme moving out of London, it being filmed in a former textile mill called the Sunny Bank Mills, located in Farsley, Leeds. For the first time ever, there were 4 finalists in the final.

The Sewers

Results and Eliminations 

 Sewer was the series winner

 Sewer was the series runner-up

 Sewer won Garment of the Week

 One of the judges' favourite sewers

 Sewer was safe and got through to next round

 One of the judges' least favourite sewers

 Sewer was eliminated

Episodes 

  Sewer eliminated   Garment of the Week

Episode 1: Capsule Wardrobe

Episode 2: Sports Week

Episode 3: Summer Week

Episode 4: Reduce, Reuse and Recycle Week

Episode 5: Children's Week

Episode 6: Music Week

Episode 7: Lingerie & Night Wear Week

Episode 8: 1930s Week

Episode 9: Japanese Week - Semi Final

Episode 10: Party Week - Final

Ratings 

Official ratings are taken from BARB.

References 

2022 British television seasons
The Great British Sewing Bee